De Vecchis is a surname of Italian origin. Notable people with the surname include:

 Mauro De Vecchis (born 1967), Italian football coach
 William De Vecchis (born 1971), Italian politician

See also
 De Vecchi

Surnames of Italian origin